Averil Margaret Lysaght (14 April 1905 – 21 August 1981) was a New Zealand biologist, science historian and artist, best known for her scholarly work on Joseph Banks.

Early life
Lysaght was born in Mokoia, Taranaki, New Zealand on 14 April 1905 to Emily Muriel Lysaght née Stowe and Brian Cuthbert Lysaght.  When she was 15 she discovered on Mount Taranaki an owlet moth previously unknown to science.  That species was described in 1921 by entomologist G. V. Hudson and named Graphania averilla in her honour.

Education
Lysaght was initially educated at home by a governess but was sent to Chilton House Private Girls Boarding School in Wellington when she was 12. In 1923 Lysaght began studying for a degree at Victoria University College, Wellington. While attending University, Lysaght joined the Victoria University tramping club and went on tramps with John Beaglehole, with whom she later collaborated on scholarly works. While studying for her bachelor's degree Lysaght published her first papers on entomology. She graduated with a Bachelor of Science degree in 1928 and obtained a master's degree in Science in 1929.  Her thesis was on the biology of Eucolaspis, a genus of beetle.  From 1927 to 1929 she was on the staff of the Cawthron Institute's department of entomology and from 1931 to 1932 she was employed by Victoria University College as a temporary assistant in zoology.

Subsequent to this Lysaght moved to England to live and continued her education.  Lysagh spent three years undertaking postgraduate research at the Rothamsted Experimental Station in London, after which she was awarded a Doctorate from the University of London in 1935. Her doctorate thesis was on the nematode parasites of thrips.

During this time Lysaght undertook artistic training first at Nottingham School of Art and later at St Martins School of Art in London.

Work
From 1935 to 1938 Lysaght was employed at the Plymouth laboratory of the Marine Biological Association of the United Kingdom. She also worked at the Imperial Institute of Entomology. Between 1936 and 1943 she published five papers in parasitology, including two papers on trematode parasites of gastropods.  Lysaght subsequently obtained employment as an assistant editor of the zoology section of Chambers Encyclopaedia.  During her time there, either in 1947 or 1948 she met Norman Boyd Kinnear, Keeper of Zoology at the British Museum of Natural History. It was Kinnear who suggested she research the birds of Cook's voyages.  He assisted her in this endeavour by providing space for her to work at the British Museum of Natural History.  Lysaght proceeded to catalogue all the bird paintings executed on all Cook's voyages. She also did in depth research on the museums' collection of Sydney Parkinson's paintings and drawings and continued to work at this project for over twenty years. As a result of her research she did much to help identify drawings by Herman Spöring, Bank's assistant.  This culminated in her publishing in 1975 The book of birds: five centuries of bird illustration.

During this time Lysaght also edited the zoological material for the Hakluyt Society's edition of Cook's first two voyages. She also provided John Cawte Beaglehole with much of the zoological and botanical notes for his books on James Cook's three voyages. In 1957, Lysaght published an article examining the mystery of the identity of "Cook's Kangaroo", the first kangaroo brought to England, and the subject of a recently rediscovered painting by George Stubbs.

Painting
'Lysaght was a talented artist, a gift that apparently first developed at Nottingham and later at Saint Martin's School of Art in London.' A solo exhibition of her work was held at the Leicester Galleries, in October 1961. Most of her water-colour paintings were on 'Siamese paper made from the fibres of the daphne bush'. Lysaght's October 1961 show of water-colours (no. 1222) coincided with ones the Leicester Galleries held for Kyffin Williams (no. 1223) and Anne Madden (no. 1221), whose work was influenced by Sam Francis, Jean-Paul Riopelle, and by her husband Louis le Brocquy, as too it seems was Lysaght's, notably Riopelle.

Death
Lysaght died on the 21 August 1981 in London.

Specimens collected
 Porina oreas
 Leuconopsis obsoleta
 Pisidium novaezelandiae
 Potamopyrgus antipodarum'

Published works
 The Book of Birds - Five Centuries of Bird Illustration Joseph Banks in Newfoundland and Labrador 1776Recognition and awards
The moth species Graphania averilla was named in her honour. 
Lysaght was awarded an honorary Degree in Literature from the Memorial University of Newfoundland in recognition of her book Joseph Banks in Newfoundland and Labrador 1776''. In 2017, Lysaght was selected as one of the Royal Society Te Apārangi's "150 women in 150 words", celebrating the contributions of women to knowledge in New Zealand.

References

External links
 Photograph of Averil Margaret Lysaght
 Painted portrait of Averil Margaret Lysaght

1905 births
1981 deaths
New Zealand biologists
New Zealand women historians
Historians of science
People from Taranaki
New Zealand women scientists
20th-century New Zealand historians
Women biologists
New Zealand illustrators
New Zealand women illustrators
20th-century New Zealand women artists
20th-century women scientists
20th-century New Zealand women writers
20th-century biologists